Rus (Russia) was a liberal-bourgeois daily newspaper published in St. Petersburg, Russia, from 1903 to 1908 with intervals and under different names like Rus (Russia), Molva (Hearsay) and Dvadtsaty Vek (The Twentieth Century).

References

1903 establishments in the Russian Empire
1908 disestablishments in the Russian Empire
Defunct newspapers published in Russia
Mass media in Saint Petersburg
Newspapers published in the Russian Empire
Publications established in 1903
Publications disestablished in 1908
Russian-language newspapers